Ezekias Papaioannou (October 8, 1908 – April 10, 1988) was a Greek Cypriot communist politician and secretary general of the left-wing political party of AKEL.

He was born in the village of Kellaki, Limassol District, and received his secondary education at the American Academy of Larnaca with financial help from his brother.  In his last year of school because of health reasons he moved to Nicosia where he finished his studies in The English School, Nicosia.  He then worked as a miner in Skouriotissa (Foukasa) and as a manual worker in Piraeus port.

He moved to London in the early 1930s where he actively worked with the Communist Party of Great Britain against different fascist factions. During this time he was arrested and jailed for three months by the British authorities. During his time in Britain he became a founding member of the Association of Cypriot Affairs which sought the expulsion of the British from Cyprus.

In 1936, he was part of a contingent of 60 Cypriot leftists who volunteered to fight in the Spanish Civil War as part of the International Brigades. 15 of them died and Ezekias was injured and had to return to London. Cyprus had the biggest percentage of volunteers and dead per capita of any country fighting against Francisco Franco.
After the war he lived in London and worked as a milkman.

With the start of  World War II Ezekias tried to enlist but he was refused because of his old injuries and a poor health. Not able to remain idle he joined the London air defence where he served until the end of the war. In 1945 he was asked by AKEL to return to Cyprus where he remained until the end of his life.

After his return, he immediately got involved in local politics and in 1946 he became editor-in-chief of the newspaper Democratis and in 1949 3rd general secretary of the Progressive Party of Working People (AKEL), a position he held for 40 years until his death.

During the next few years he worked endlessly along with his party for the rights of workers and against British colonialism. The party was declared illegal by the British authorities in 1955 and Ezekias together with another 134 members  were arrested and jailed. Soon after Ezekias escaped and continued the fight until Independence in 1959.

Ezekias was against the Zürich and London Agreement, claiming it was unworkable. He worked for the next two decades to prevent all tactics of the extreme right wing elements of the island and to foster better relations with the Turkish Cypriots.

In 1960, following the independence of Cyprus from the British Empire, he was elected to parliament. Papaioannou was repeatedly re-elected and served as a member of Parliament for 28 consecutive years up until his death in 1988.

In his will, he left all his assets to his party.

References

1908 births
1988 deaths
Leaders of political parties in Cyprus
People of the Spanish Civil War
Progressive Party of Working People politicians
International Brigades personnel
Leaders of the Progressive Party of Working People